The dusky-tailed antbird (Drymophila malura) is an insectivorous bird in the antbird family Thamnophilidae. It is found in southeast Brazil, southern Paraguay, and northeast Argentina (Misiones Province). Its natural habitat is subtropical or tropical moist lowland forest.

The dusky-tailed antbird was described by the Dutch zoologist Coenraad Jacob Temminck in 1825 and given the binomial name Myiothera malura. It is now placed in the genus Drymophila which was introduced by the English naturalist William Swainson in 1824.
The specific epithet malura  is from the Ancient Greek malos "soft" or "weak".

References

External links
Xeno-canto: audio recordings of the dusky-tailed antbird

Drymophila
Birds of the Atlantic Forest
Birds of Paraguay
Birds described in 1825
Taxonomy articles created by Polbot